James Henigan (April 25, 1892 – February 27, 1950) was an American long-distance runner. He competed at the 1924, 1928 and the 1932 Summer Olympics. He also won the Boston Marathon in 1931.

References

External links
 

1892 births
1950 deaths
Athletes (track and field) at the 1924 Summer Olympics
Athletes (track and field) at the 1928 Summer Olympics
Athletes (track and field) at the 1932 Summer Olympics
American male long-distance runners
American male marathon runners
Boston Marathon male winners
Olympic track and field athletes of the United States
Track and field athletes from Boston
Olympic cross country runners
20th-century American people